The Last Hard Men is a 1976 Western film directed by Andrew McLaglen, based on the 1971 novel Gundown by Brian Garfield. It stars Charlton Heston and James Coburn, with supporting roles by Barbara Hershey, Jorge Rivero, Michael Parks, and Larry Wilcox in his screen debut.

Plot
In 1909 Arizona, Captain Sam Burgade has retired from his law enforcement career with the Arizona Rangers. Hoping for peace and quiet, he suddenly learns that his old enemy, Zach Provo, has escaped from a Yuma prison with other convicts. Zach Provo is a half-Indian outlaw who dreams of exacting revenge on Burgade, not only for putting him away, but for the death of his Indian wife who was killed in a crossfire years before. Burgade was shot by Provo and barely survived, but he later sent Provo to prison. Now out for revenge, Provo does not go after a cash shipment as Burgade expects, but instead kidnaps Burgade's daughter, Susan.

The six escaped men form an ambush. Provo allows two of them to rape Susan in full view of Burgade and Brickman, assuming Burgade will show himself in an attempt to rescue her. In order to prevent him from doing so, Brickman knocks Burgade unconscious, and he is unable to intervene.

With Brickman's help, they set a fire to smoke out the fugitives, Burgade is able to dispose of them one by one until only Provo is left. But he finds himself at gunpoint, then is shot by Provo several times and Provo is about to cut out Burgade's heart when he is able to retaliate at last with a handgun shooting Provo through his chest. The film ends with Susan and Brickman tending to Burgade's injuries.

Cast
 Charlton Heston as Sam Burgade
 James Coburn as Zach Provo
 Barbara Hershey as Susan Burgade
 Jorge Rivero as Cesar Menendez
 Michael Parks as Sheriff Noel Nye
 Larry Wilcox as Mike Shelby
 Thalmus Rasulala as George Weed
 Morgan Paull as Portugee Shiraz
 John Quade as Will Gant
 Robert Donner as Lee Roy Tucker
 Christopher Mitchum as Hal Brickman
 Riley Hill as Gus Stanton

Production
Coburn said "“It was very hard to justify my character’s vendetta with Charlton Heston. He had no redeeming qualities. He was just out for revenge. The director  was Andrew V. McLaglen. He knows how to go out, shoot a film and get it done. That’s about all. He’s another director for hire.”

Reception

Critical response
New York Times film critic, Richard Eder gave the film a mostly positive review, writing, "'The Last Hard Men" is not just a horse opera; it's practically Tristan and Isolde. Only the love-death relation isn't between a man and a woman but between a retired lawman and a half-breed Navajo who is obsessed with the notion of killing him ... Some of the chases are well done, particularly a night scene when the daughter tries to escape the bandits and is hauled back. I liked the dry performance of Michael Parks as the young sheriff who has more faith in his telephone than in old-fashioned shoot-outs.'

Variety magazine said of the film, "The Last Hard Men is a fairly good actioner with handsome production values and some thoughtful overtones...The details of life at a crucial transition point in American history are well captured in the script and in the art direction."

References

External links
 
 

1976 films
1976 Western (genre) films
20th Century Fox films
American Western (genre) films
1970s English-language films
Films based on Western (genre) novels
Films based on works by Brian Garfield
Films directed by Andrew McLaglen
Films scored by Jerry Goldsmith
Films set in 1909
Films set in Arizona
American historical films
1970s historical films
1970s American films